Ecuador Department was one of the departments of Gran Colombia.

It had borders to:
 Azuay Department in the South.
 Guayaquil Department in the West.

Subdivisions 
3 provincias and 15 cantones:

 Pichincha Province. Capital: Quito. Cantones: Quito, Machachi, Latacunga, Quijos y Esmeraldas.
 Imbabura Province. Capital: Ibarra. Cantones: Ibarra, Otavalo, Cotacachi y Cayambe.
 Chimborazo Province. Capital: Riobamba. Cantones: Riobamba, Ambato, Guano, Guaranda, Alausí y Macas.

Departments of Gran Colombia